Darío Oscar Scotto (born September 1, 1969 in Buenos Aires) is a former Argentine footballer. He currently played club football in Argentina Spain, Mexico, Paraguay, Chile and Bolivia and played for the Argentina national football team.

Scotto started his professional career with Platense in 1987. He became a consistent goalscorer, tying Diego Latorre as the topscorer of the 1992 Clausura. this achievement won him a call up to the Argentina national team and a move to Spanish side  Sporting de Gijón.

In 1993 Scotto was signed by Mexican club Necaxa but he soon returned to Argentina where he signed for Rosario Central. In 1995, he joined Boca Juniors where he played alongside Diego Maradona. After a good season in the Apertura 1995 where he scored 7 goals, he struggled to maintain his form and returned to Rosario Central in 1996.

In 1997, he endured a desperate season with Gimnasia y Tiro before joining Argentinos Juniors in 1998.

In the latter part of his career he played for Cerro Porteño in Paraguay, Santiago Wanderers in Chile and Aurora in Bolivia. He retired in 2003.

Honours

Club
Santiago Wanderers
 Primera División de Chile (1): 2001

References

External links
 
 
 Argentine Primera statistics at Fútbol XXI  

1969 births
Living people
Footballers from Buenos Aires
Argentine footballers
Association football forwards
Argentine expatriate footballers
Argentina youth international footballers
Argentina under-20 international footballers
Argentina international footballers
Gimnasia y Tiro footballers
Club Atlético Platense footballers
Sporting de Gijón players
Club Necaxa footballers
Rosario Central footballers
Boca Juniors footballers
Argentinos Juniors footballers
Cerro Porteño players
Club Aurora players
Santiago Wanderers footballers
Argentine Primera División players
La Liga players
Liga MX players
Chilean Primera División players
Expatriate footballers in Chile
Expatriate footballers in Bolivia
Expatriate footballers in Paraguay
Expatriate footballers in Spain
Expatriate footballers in Mexico